The Committee on the Constitution (KU) is a parliamentary committee in the Swedish Riksdag. The committee's responsibilities include examining issues relating to the Swedish Constitution and Administrative laws, as well as examining the Prime Minister's performance of duties and the handling of government matters. The committee's activities are regulated by the Riksdag.

Given the committee's significant power, it has been agreed since 1991 that the Speaker of the committee shall come from the opposition party. Since October 2022, the Speaker of the committee has been Ida Karkiainen from the Social Democratic Party, and the vice-Speaker of the committee is "to be elected" from the Moderate Party.

The committee is made up of seventeen elected members of the Riksdag with representation from all political parties.

History 
The first Swedish legislative committee founded for the purpose of watching over the constitution was in May 1809, at the time of the Riksdag of the Estates. The committee played an important role in the development of the new form of government that was adopted on 6 June in the same year. The first Speaker of the committee was Lars August Mannerheim, and the first Secretary of the committee was Hans Järta.

The committee was permanently established by the Instrument of Government, §53, in 1809, which describes the committee's function:

To bring issues concerning changes in the constitutions and opinions thereof to the attention of the estates of the state, and to review the minutes kept by the Government

Its tasks are similarly set out by §§ 105-107 of the Riksdagsstadgan (parliamentary rules):

The principal function remains unchanged, but a function has to adapt itself to modern society's conditions and the change in state.

Tasks 

The concerns of the Committee on the Constitution are the Swedish constitutions and the Riksdag's rules of procedure, and the committee is an important element of the Riksdag's power. The committee oversees legislation on the constitution and administrative law; on television, radio and film; press and party support; the Riksdag, offices in the Riksdag, such as the National Audit Office and the Ombudsman (but not the Riksbank); review of government ministers; freedom of the press and expression; municipal self-government; opinion formation; and freedom of religion.

The Committee submits so-called KU-anmälningar (Constitutional Committee reports). The ongoing review is presented annually in a report, called the review report, formerly known as the "discharge report" (Swedish: dechargebetänkandet). When a report about a person is sent to the committee, a hearing is then held. Since 1988, the public has been allowed to witness these hearings. It is common for the committee to criticize a government minister after a hearing, resulting in a vote of no confidence. The committee also has the last word in certain deliberations prior to a Riksdag decision.

Impeachments 
If impeachment should proceed against a government minister, it would be the Committee that decides this. The case would then go to Sweden's Supreme Court. The last time a minister was impeached in Sweden was during the mid-1800s, under the now-defunct impeachment law.

List of speakers for the committee

Speakers before 1971 (bicameral Riksdag) 
1809/1810: Lars August Mannerheim
1823: Baltzar von Platen
1828/1830: Lars August Mannerheim
1834/1835: Jakob Cederström
1840/1841: Carl Henrik Anckarsvärd
1851–1858:Gustaf Lagerbjelke
1859/1860, 1862/1863, 1867/1871: Thomas Munck af Rosenschöld
1871: Gustaf af Ugglas
1872/1875: Thomas Munck af Rosenschöld
1876–1887B: Magnus Hallenborg
1888:Gunnar Wennerberg
1888–1898: Oscar Bergius
1899: Gustaf Åkerhielm
1900–1901: Gustaf Rudebeck
1902–1905 ( riksdagen): Hugo Blomberg
1906–1908: Hugo Blomberg
1909–1910: Karl Staaff
1911: Ernst Trygger
1912: Carl Carlsson Bonde
1912: Theodor af Callerholm
1913–1917: Nils Edén
1918: Otto Mannheimer
1918 (urtima Riksdag): Jakob Pettersson
1919 (urtima Riksdag): Jakob Pettersson
1919 (urtima Riksdag)–1921: Viktor Larsson in Västerås
1922–1923: Sam Clason
1924: Viktor Larsson in Västerås
1925–1929: Knut von Geijer
1930–1938: Carl Axel Reuterskiöld
1939 (lagtima riksdagen)–1958 (B): Harald Hallén
1959–1964: Bengt Elmgren
1965–1972: Georg Pettersson

After 1971 (unicameral Riksdag)

List of vice-speakers for the committee

Vice-speakers before 1971 (bicameral Riksdag) 
Johan Sjöberg 1869
Lars Johan Hierta 1871U
Pehr von Ehrenheim 1872 -1973
Magnus Hallenborg 1874 - 1875
Johan Sjöberg 1876 - 1878
Johan Nordenfalk 1879 - 1880
Adolf Erik Nordenskiöld 1884 - 1885
Per Siljeström 1886
Axel Ljungman 1887A
Johan Sjöberg 1887B
Axel Ljungman 1891 - 1899
Fredrik Barnekow 1900 - 1905L
Gullbrand Elowson 1905 1U - 1906
Theodor af Callerholm 1907 - 1909
Johan Fredrik Nyström 1910
Theodor af Callerholm 1911
Hjalmar Branting 1912 - 1914A
Sam Clason 1914B - 1917
Viktor Larsson in Västerås 1918L - 1918U
Sam Clason 1919 - 1921
Arthur Engberg 1922 - 1923
Knut von Geijer 1925
Arthur Engberg 1926 - 1928
Harald Hallén 1933 - 1938
Anton Pettersson 1939L - 1939U
Gustaf Adolf Björkman 1940 - 1940U
Jones Erik Andersson 1941 - 1951
John Pettersson 1952 -1960
Torsten Andersson 1961 - 1968
Gunnar Larsson 1969 - 1971

After 1971 (unicameral Riksdag)

References

Further reading
 Stig Hadenius, Riksdagen : En svensk historia (Stockholm, 1994)
 Riksdagsordningen och Regeringsformen, 1809 års regeringsform

External links
Riksdagen - Konstitutionsutskottet
Riksdag website
Constitution Committee website
svt.se Background: Så arbetar konstitutionsutskottet (Swedish: How the Constitution Committee works) May 24, 2007

Committees of the Riksdag